The sport of football in Taiwan is run by the Chinese Taipei Football Association. The association administers all national football teams, as well as national competitions.

History

Edward Band was credited with introducing football to Taiwan during his tenure as teacher and principal of the Presbyterian Church High School, subsequently renamed .

The sport has grown near the status of historically most popular baseball.

Current structure
In 2017 the sport was revamped in Taiwan with the introduction of the Taiwan Football Premier League. The season saw the country's first entry to the AFC Cup when Hang Yuen qualified for the 2018 AFC Cup group stage. The TFPL is currently the only national football division administered by the CTFA. Other amateur league operate in the country, including the T2 League and the Taiwan International Football League - TIFL. The domestic cup is the Chinese Taipei FA Cup, which the winners gain entry into the AFC Cup qualifiers.

Taiwan is currently ongoing systematic reforms in hope to elevate football and turn the sport from semi-professional into a professional one.

See also

Sport in Taiwan
List of stadiums in Taiwan
Football in China

References